The Ugandan national cricket team toured Kenya in August 1952 and played one three-day match against the Kenyan team. It was the first ever match between the two teams and part of a series of occasional matches against countries in east Africa which would eventually lead to a formal triangular tournament being introduced in 1967.

Only match

References

1952 in Kenyan cricket
Ugandan cricket tours abroad